Altiplano de Sierra Nevada (previously called Norte de Granada) is a Spanish geographical indication for Vino de la Tierra wines located in the autonomous region of Andalusia. Vino de la Tierra is one step below the mainstream Denominación de Origen indication on the Spanish wine quality ladder.

The area covered by this geographical indication comprises certain municipalities in the north of the province of Granada (Andalusia, Spain).

It acquired its Vino de la Tierra status in 2005.

Grape varieties
 Red: Garnacha Tinta, Monastrell, Cabernet Franc, Pinot Noir, Syrah, Cabernet Sauvignon, Tempranillo and Merlot
 White: Baladí Verdejo, Airén, Torrontés, Palomino, Pedro Ximénez, Chardonnay and Macabeo

References

External links

Spanish wine
Wine regions of Spain
Appellations